Picherande is a commune in the Puy-de-Dôme département in Auvergne in central France.

Geography
The river Rhue forms all of the commune's eastern border.

See also
Communes of the Puy-de-Dôme department

References

Communes of Puy-de-Dôme